The 2004 WNBA season was the seventh season for the Detroit Shock. They were unable to defend their title the year before, losing in the first round to the New York Liberty.

Offseason

Dispersal Draft
Based on the Shock's 2004 record, they would pick 13th in the Cleveland Rockers dispersal draft. The Shock picked Jennifer Rizzotti.

WNBA Draft

Regular season

Season standings

Season schedule

Playoffs

Player stats
Note: GP = Games played; REB = Rebound; AST = Assists; STL = Steals; BLK = Blocks; PTS = Points

References

Detroit Shock seasons
Detroit
Detroit Shock